Colin Fitz Lives!, also known simply as Colin Fitz is a 1997 independent film directed by Robert Bella. Colin Fitz Lives! was shot on 35mm in New York City. The budget was $150,000 and the film was shot in 14 days. It had its World Premiere in Dramatic Competition at the 1997 Sundance Film Festival. The film won awards at several film festivals, including the Austin Film Festival and the Long Island Film Festival. However, it did not receive theatrical distribution, as Bella lacked the funds to finish the film's post-production, pay deferred salaries, and secure music rights for more than a decade after the festival.

In August 2010, IFC Films released a newly remastered version of the film as part of its Video On Demand platform.

Plot 
On the anniversary of a famous rock star's death, security guards Paul Matt McGrath and Grady (Andy Fowle) must try to protect his grave, where a group of his fanatical admirers had killed themselves the year before.

Cast
John C. McGinley as Groundskeeper
Matt McGrath as Paul
William H. Macy as Mr. O'Day
Andy Fowle as Grady
Julianne Phillips as Justice Fitz
Robert Bella as Pepe
Will McCormack as Todd
Erik Jensen as Dean
Martha Plimpton as Ann
Mary McCormack as Moira
Chris Bauer as Tony Baby Shark
Casper Andreas as Mats (as Casper Andreasson)
Toni Pearen as Pandemonium Fan
Kristen Johnston as Stalker Fan

Awards and nominations
Sundance Film Festival
Nominated, 1997, Grand Jury Prize for Dramatic (Robert Bella)
Austin Film Festival
Nominated, 1997, Feature Film Award (Tom Morrissey (writer)/Robert Bella (director))
Won, 1997, Feature Film Award for Cinematography (Henry Cline)
Won, 1997, Feature Film Award for Best Feature (Robert Bella)
Won, 1997, Audience Award (Robert Bella)
Florida Film Festival
Nominated, 1997, Grand Jury Award for Narrative (Robert Bella)
Long Island Film Festival
Won, 1997, Best of Fest (Robert Bella)
WorldFest Houston awards
Won, 1997, Gold Award for Comedy (Robert Bella)

Reception 
On the review aggregator Rotten Tomatoes, the film has only 2 reviews, both positive. Prairie Miller of NewsBlaze praises the characters and "goof chemistry", while Mark R. Leeper of Leeper's Reviews admires the focus on the screenplay.

Sources

https://movies.yahoo.com/feature/movie-talk-sundance-favorite-finally-gets-released.html
movies.nytimes.com
www.hollywood.com
www.the-numbers.com
www.nycmovieguru.com

External links 
 
 
 Sundance Selects – Colin Fitz Lives!

1997 films
American independent films
1997 comedy films
1990s English-language films
1990s American films